Prevc is a Slovene surname. Notable people with the surname include the Prevc family, all professional ski jumpers:

Peter Prevc (born 1992)
Cene Prevc (born 1996)
Domen Prevc (born 1999)
Nika Prevc (born 2005)

Slovene-language surnames